Seegård Church is a parish church of the Church of Norway in Gjøvik Municipality in Innlandet county, Norway. It is located in the village of Seegård. It is one of the churches for the Snertingdal parish which is part of the Toten prosti (deanery) in the Diocese of Hamar. The brown, wooden church was built in a rectangular design in 1997 using plans drawn up by the architect Arne Thorsrud. The church seats about 250 people.

History
The earliest existing historical records of the church date back to the year 1575, but the church was not built that year. The first church in Seegård was a wooden stave church that was possibly built during the 14th century. In 1617, the old choir torn down and a new choir was built on the same site. In 1652, a sacristy was added on to the building.

The new church was designed by Amund Nilsen Gloppe. This new building was consecrated in 1782. This church burned down on Palm Sunday (27 March) 1994, destroying the church and none of the historic interior furnishings were saved. Soon after, the parish began planning for a new church building on the same site. The new church was designed by Arne Thorsrud and consecrated in 1997. The new church includes the main nave and chancel room, plus it also has a church hall, some smaller rooms, and a kitchen.

Media gallery

See also
List of churches in Hamar

References

Gjøvik
Churches in Innlandet
Churches in Toten Deanery
Rectangular churches in Norway
Wooden churches in Norway
20th-century Church of Norway church buildings
Churches completed in 1997
14th-century establishments in Norway